is a  mountain of Omine Mountains, which is located on the border of Tenkawa and Kamikitayama,  Yoshino District, Nara Prefecture, Japan.

Outline
This mountain is the tallest mountain in Kansai Region including Nara Prefecture. This mountain is one of the 100 Famous Japanese Mountains.
The name of this mountain, ‘Hakkyō’, literally means ‘eight Buddhist scriptures’, derived from the legend which says a famous En no Gyōja, believed to be a founder of Shugendo, buried eight Buddhist scriptures on the top of this mountain.
This mountain is also called Hakken-zan, literally ‘mountain of eight swords’ or Bukkyō-ga-take, also literally ‘mountain of Buddhist scriptures’.
Sometimes, this mountain is mistaken for Mount Omine.

Routes
The mountain has several routes to the summit. The easiest is from Gyojamodori-Tunnel-Nishi-guchi, taking about three hours. The traditional route is from Tenkawa-Kawai, a seven-hour journey.

Gallery

References

Sources
 Official Home Page of the Geographical Survey Institute in Japan
 Omine, Daitaka, Odaigahara

Hakkyo
Highest points of Japanese national parks